Jason Howden is a New Zealand film director and visual effects artist.

Background
Howden was born and raised in Greymouth, New Zealand. He left high school at age 17 and started his career as a television cameraman and editor at a local television station in Nelson. He began his directing career with his short film Automaton in 2005. Howden wrote and directed his debut feature Deathgasm in 2014. The film won several awards at Toronto After Dark Film Festival and other international film festivals.

Between 2017 and 2018, Howden wrote the feature film Guns Akimbo, and an adaptation of  video game Dead Island. In 2019, he directed Guns Akimbo, starring Daniel Radcliffe and Samara Weaving, which premiered at the Toronto International Film Festival on 9 September 2019. The film was released in New Zealand on 5 March 2020 by Madman Entertainment.

In September 2022, Howden was set to direct an adaptation of Monsters of Metal, based on the comics he had written with Llexi Leon. The director was also attached as a co-writer along with Leon.

Since 2001, Howden has been working as a visual effects artist on films. He has worked on visual effects in several Hollywood movies, including The Hobbit: The Battle of the Five Armies, The Hobbit: The Desolation of Smaug, The Hobbit: An Unexpected Journey, Man of Steel, Gods of Egypt, and War for the Planet of the Apes, among others.

Selected filmography

Director 
 2003 Parabiosis
 2005 Automaton
 2008 Veil 
 2010 Melodies of the Heart 
 2014 The Light Harvester 
 2015 Deathgasm
 2019 Guns Akimbo

Visual effects 
 2021 Spiderhead
 2021 The Beatles: Get Back
 2021 Shang-Chi and the Legend of the Ten Rings 
 2021 Night Raiders
 2017 War for the Planet of the Apes
 2017 Pork Pie
 2016 Gods of Egypt
 2014 The Light Harvester
 2014 The Hobbit: The Battle of the Five Armies
 2013 The Hobbit: The Desolation of Smaug 
 2013 Romeo and Juliet: A Love Song
 2013 The Wolverine
 2013 Man of Steel 
 2012 The Hobbit: An Unexpected Journey 
 2005 Automaton

References

External links
 
 

New Zealand film directors
Visual effects artists
People from Wellington City
Year of birth missing (living people)
Living people